William de Beauchamp (c.1186–1260) was a British judge and high sheriff.

Early life
Beauchamp was the son of Simon de Beauchamp (c.1145–1206/7) and his wife Isabel, whose parents are unknown.

Magna Carta baron
De Beauchamp took part in the 1210 expedition to Ireland and the 1214 expedition to Poitiers before joining the rebellious barons in 1215 at the beginning of the First Barons' War, entertaining them at his seat of Bedford Castle; as such, de Beauchamp was one of the rebels excommunicated by Pope Innocent III.

Involvement in military actions
De Beauchamp was captured at the Battle of Lincoln on 20 May 1217 but made his peace with the government. By this point he had already lost Bedford Castle to Falkes de Breauté in 1215, leading to an odd situation: Breauté was granted the castle, while de Beauchamp held the barony. When Breauté fell from power Bedford Castle was besieged and partially destroyed on royal orders, but de Beauchamp was granted licence to build a residence within its Bailey. He was part of a royal expedition ambushed by Richard Marshal in 1233, and was appointed a Baron of the Exchequer in 1234 and 1237.

Other offices
He also served as Sheriff of Buckinghamshire and Bedfordshire for 1236 and when Eleanor of Provence was crowned queen that year he served as an almoner.

Family and death
He married Ida Longespee, daughter of William Longespée, 3rd Earl of Salisbury and Ela, Countess of Salisbury.

He died in 1260, leaving a son, also called William, as well as five other children.

References

12th-century births
1260 deaths
13th-century English judges
Anglo-Normans
English soldiers
Magna Carta barons
Norman warriors
High Sheriffs of Buckinghamshire
High Sheriffs of Bedfordshire
People from Bedford